St Mary's Priory or the Priory Church of St Mary may refer to:

England
Bushmead Priory, Bedfordshire
Parish and Priory Church of St Mary, Totnes, Devon
St Mary's Priory Church, Deerhurst, Gloucestershire
Lancaster Priory, Lancashire
St Mary's Priory, Coxford, Norfolk
Binham Priory, Norfolk
St. Mary's Priory and Cathedral, Coventry, West Midlands
Bridlington Priory, Yorkshire

Ireland
St. Mary's Dominican Priory, Tallaght, Parish Church, Retreat Centre and educational institution - The Priory Institute

Wales
Priory Church of St Mary, Abergavenny, Monmouthshire
Priory and Parish Church of St Mary, Chepstow, Monmoutshire
St Mary's Priory Church, Monmouth, Monmouthshire
The Priory and Parish Church of Saint Mary (Beddgelert)

Scotland
St Mary's Priory, Isle of Trahil, in Galloway, Scotland
St Mary's Priory, North Berwick, in East Lothian, Scotland

See also
St Mary's Church (disambiguation)